John Alfred Hannah (October 9, 1902 – February 23, 1991) was president of Michigan State College (later Michigan State University) for 28 years (1941–1969), making him the longest serving of MSU's presidents. He is credited with transforming the school from a regional undergraduate college into a large national research institution. After his resignation from the university, Hannah became head of the United States Agency for International Development (USAID).

Biography 

A native of Grand Rapids, Hannah was most noted for expanding Michigan State from a respected regional undergraduate-oriented institution into a comprehensive national  research university, and for helping to get Michigan State into the Big Ten Conference. He was also the first chairman of the United States Commission on Civil Rights.

Hannah became president of Michigan State College in 1941. He thus began the largest expansion in the school's history, with the help of the 1945 G.I. Bill, which helped World War II veterans get an education. During this time the university grew by leaps and bounds to accommodate an ever-growing influx of students. One of Hannah's strategies was to build a new residence hall, enroll enough students to fill it, and use the income to start construction on a new dormitory. Under Hannah's plan, enrollment increased from 15,000 in 1950 to 38,000 in 1965.

While he worked on increasing the size of M.S.C.'s student body, Hannah also expanded the institution from a college of regional reputation into a nationally recognized research university. When the University of Chicago eliminated its athletics and resigned from what is now the Big Ten Conference in 1946, Hannah lobbied hard to take its place. The Big Ten finally admitted M.S.C. in 1950. Five years later, on the College's centennial year of 1955, the State of Michigan made it a university. In 1957 he continued M.S.U.'s expansion co-founding Michigan State University–Oakland (now Oakland University) with Matilda Dodge Wilson. The Hannah Hall of Science on Oakland University's campus is named for him.  Michigan State University continued to expand throughout the 1960s, completing its newest dormitory in 1967. None have been built since.

By 1969, Vietnam-era protests had completely reshaped the university. Much of the controversy surrounded Hannah and the University's involvement in Vietnam with the Michigan State University Group (MSUG). Hannah was accused of being responsible for allowing the CIA to involve itself in MSUG. Hannah resigned to become the head of USAID.

Legacy
The John A. Hannah Distinguished Professorship at Michigan State University was established in 1966.

As part of its sesquicentennial celebration, MSU erected a 7-foot bronze statue of Hannah in front of his namesake administration building on September 17, 2004, sculpted by California artist Bruce Wolfe.

Additionally, the football team retired the number 46 in honor of 46 years of service to the university.

References

External links
   International developmental assistance : a statement by the Task Force on International Developmental Assistance and International Education, National Association of State Universities and Land-Grant Colleges, John A. Hannah, Ira L. Baldwin, et al., International Programs Office, National Association of State Universities and Land Grant Colleges (NASULGC), January 1969

Michigan State University alumni
1902 births
1991 deaths
United States Commission on Civil Rights members
Presidents of Michigan State University
Administrators of the United States Agency for International Development
Grand Rapids Community College alumni
20th-century American academics